Drop Dead Gorgeous is a British comedy-drama for BBC Three. Set in Runcorn, it tells the story of 15-year-old Ashley Webb (played by Sinéad Moynihan), whose life is turned upside-down when she is approached by a spotter from a local modelling agency. Events move at lightning speed and the whole family, including Ashley's non-identical twin sister Jade (played by Linzey Cocker), are affected.

The first episode was shown on BBC Three on Sunday, 11 June 2006 at 10pm, with weekly episodes until the finale, which aired on 2 July 2006. The first series was shown for the first time on BBC One in August 2007, in the run up to the premiere of the second series on BBC Three. The second series began on 16 September 2007 at 9pm, again with weekly episodes until the finale on 22 October 2007.

Cast 
Pauline Webb played by Kathryn Hunt
Terry Webb played by Connor McIntyre 
Ashley Webb played by Sinéad Moynihan
Jade Webb played by Linzey Cocker
Mikey Webb played by Lee Worswick
Val Duggan played by Elizabeth Berrington
Ben McIntyre played by Andrew Knott
Murray Priestman played by Lee Boardman
Tiggsy Willis played by Dominic Carter

Score
The music was especially commissioned and composed by Tristin Norwell & Nick Green.

Locations 
Although the series itself is set in the town of Runcorn in Cheshire, the school used is Philips High School in Whitefield, which is situated about 20–30 miles away from Runcorn, and is a pleasant, leafy suburb of northwest Manchester near the market town of Bury.

In the first series, some scenes set in London were actually recorded in Manchester. In one scene, the famous London Eye big wheel, had been digitally added using CGI methods, and was seen behind Manchester's Bridgewater Hall, the home of Manchester's Hallé Orchestra.

Some of the second series was filmed at The Lowry, Salford Quays and M2 Nightclub in Manchester. Most of the interiors were shot at The Pie Factory sound stage complex, also on Salford Quays.

Episodes

Series 1 (2006)

Series 2 (2007)

References

External links 
 
 

BBC television dramas
2000s British drama television series
2006 British television series debuts
2007 British television series endings
Television shows set in Manchester